The 1996–97 NBA season was the Pacers' 21st season in the National Basketball Association, and 30th season as a franchise. During the off-season, the Pacers acquired Jalen Rose and Reggie Williams from the Denver Nuggets. The Pacers also received the tenth pick in the 1996 NBA draft from the Nuggets, which they used to select Erick Dampier out of Mississippi State. However, after playing just two games for the team, Williams was then traded to the New Jersey Nets in exchange for Vincent Askew. Injuries and sluggish play would hamper the Pacers all season long as Rik Smits only played 52 games due to a foot injury, while Derrick McKey only appeared in just 50 games due to a foot injury, and a ruptured Achilles tendon, and Haywoode Workman was lost for the remainder of the season with a knee injury after only playing just four games.

The Pacers got off to a slow 3–8 start, then won five straight games, but continued to struggle playing around .500 for the remainder of the season, holding a 23–23 record at the All-Star break. At midseason, the team traded Askew and Eddie Johnson to the Denver Nuggets in exchange for former Pacers guard Mark Jackson and former Pacers forward LaSalle Thompson. Jackson, who returned to Indiana after a brief stint with the Nuggets, would remain with the Pacers until 2000, where the team reached the NBA Finals. He also led the league with 11.4 assists per game. The Pacers missed the playoffs for the first time in eight years with a disappointing 39–43 record, sixth in the Central Division.

Reggie Miller led the team in scoring with 21.6 points per game, and also led the league with 229 three-point field goals, while Smits averaged 17.1 points and 6.9 rebounds per game. In addition, Antonio Davis provided the team with 10.5 points and 7.3 rebounds per game, while Dale Davis contributed 10.4 points and 9.7 rebounds per game, second-year guard Travis Best provided with 9.9 points, 4.2 assists and 1.3 steals per game, and McKey contributed 8.0 points and 4.8 rebounds per game. Off the bench, Rose contributed 7.3 points per game, while Duane Ferrell provided with 6.4 points per game, and Dampier averaged 5.1 points and 4.1 rebounds per game.

Following the season, head coach Larry Brown, who won his 600th game during the season, was forced to resign after coaching the Pacers for four seasons; he would later on take a coaching job with the Philadelphia 76ers. Also following the season, Dampier and Ferrell were both traded to the Golden State Warriors, and Thompson retired.

Offseason

Draft picks

Roster

Regular season

Season standings

z – clinched division title
y – clinched division title
x – clinched playoff spot

Record vs. opponents

Game log

|-
|| || || || || ||

|-
|| || || || || ||

|-
|| || || || || ||

|-
|| || || || || ||

|-
|| || || || || ||

|-
|| || || || || ||
|-

Player statistics

Season

Player Statistics Citation:

Awards and records

Transactions

Overview

Trades

Free agents

Player Transactions Citation:

References

See also
 1996–97 NBA season

Indiana Pacers seasons
Pace
Pace
Indiana